is a Japanese yuri manga written and illustrated by Dr. Pepperco. Goodbye, My Rose Garden was serialized online on MAGxiv starting in 2018 and was collected into three bound volume by Mag Garden. It was licensed for an English-language release by Seven Seas Entertainment in 2019.

Plot 
Early in the twentieth century, Hanako travels from Japan to England to follow her dream of meeting the reclusive  novelist, Victor Franks, and to become a novelist herself. In her attempts to meet Victor Franks, Hanako finds herself employment as a personal maid to noblewoman Alice Douglas who reveals that she can introduce her to him — but only under one condition. Hanako must kill Alice. Shocked by her request, Hanako tries to learn more about Alice to better understand why she would make such a request, growing closer to her in the process.

Characters 
Hanako Kujo
 An aspiring novelist who travels to England in hopes of meeting her favourite author, Victor Franks. She instead finds herself as a personal maid to the noblewoman Alice Douglas.

Alice Douglas
 A noblewoman who takes Hanako on as her personal maid after finding out that she is trying to find Victor Franks. Alice fears that rumours surrounding her once having an affair with her governess will cause disgrace to her family.

Edward
 A nobleman who is arranged to marry Alice. He hopes their marriage will do away with any of the rumours surrounding Alice and is suspicious of her relationship with Hanako.

Media

Manga

Drama Readings 
On February 8 and 9, 2020, a reading of Goodbye, My Rose Garden  was performed at TACCS1179 in Tokyo, with Moeka Koizumi playing Hanako Kujo and Kaya Okuno playing Alice Douglas.

Reception 
Goodbye, My Rose Garden generally received positive reviews with many praising the detailed illustration work throughout and its realistic portrayal of homosexuality in twentieth century England. In Anime News Network's Spring 2020 Manga Guide, Rebecca Silverman praised the level of research that is apparent in the manga's execution, noting clothes, literature and history events are all correct for the period and that this research aids in grounding the story. Otaku USA noted that the story beats would be familiar to those who read yuri manga, however they still recommended the titled, "Predictable as it is, Goodbye, My Rose Garden is still worth reading for its period setting and delicately written characters." While Comic Book Resources' Anthony Gramuglia felt that the first volume let the historical setting become too much of the focus, rather than the characters, he still believed that "Goodbye, My Rose Garden is a great case of historical fiction. It captures the tension and anxieties of the era beautifully, while relaying a story of forbidden love."

References

External links 
 

2018 manga
2010s LGBT literature
England in fiction
Fictional maids
Historical anime and manga
LGBT in anime and manga
Seven Seas Entertainment titles
Yuri (genre) anime and manga
Shōnen manga
Mag Garden manga